The Goethe State Forest is in the U.S. state of Florida. The  forest is located near the gulf coast, north of Dunnellon. Four trailheads are located on County Road 337.  The main trail usage is equestrian, both riders and carts.  Goethe is known for its population of red cockaded woodpeckers, a rare bird endemic to the longleaf pine forests of the southeastern coastal plain.

The forest was established in 1992 and named for James Tillinghast Goethe (1897-1993), a local lumber company owner who donated most of his land to the state for preservation. Other tracts of the land were purchased separately in 2010.

The main tract of the forest is also co-owned by the Florida Fish and Wildlife Conservation Commission, which declares it the Goethe Wildlife Management Area. The Watermelon Pond tracts were purchased by the FWC in 2007 and merged with the forest in 2010.

Gallery

See also
List of Florida state forests
List of Florida state parks

References

External links

 Florida Forest Service- FDACS

Florida state forests
Protected areas of Alachua County, Florida
Protected areas of Levy County, Florida